Wilfried Louis (born 25 October 1949) is a Haitian football defender who played for Haiti in the 1974 FIFA World Cup. He also played for Don Bosco FC.

References

External links
FIFA profile

1949 births
Haitian footballers
Don Bosco FC players
Ligue Haïtienne players
Haiti international footballers
Association football defenders
1974 FIFA World Cup players
Living people